Marc Cintron (born 22 November 1990) is a Puerto Rican international footballer who plays for Providence College.

Career
Cintron grew up in Piscataway, New Jersey played college soccer for Providence College. During the 2010 and 2011 seasons he played for USL Premier Development League side Central Jersey Spartans.

Cintron was drafted 43rd by the New York Red Bulls in the 2013 MLS Supplemental Draft.

International
The striker made his international debut for Puerto Rico in 2012. On August 15, 2012 he scored his first international goal for Puerto Rico, in a friendly match against Spain.

References

1990 births
Living people
American soccer players
Puerto Rican footballers
Puerto Rico international footballers
Providence Friars men's soccer players
Central Jersey Spartans players
Soccer players from New Jersey
New York Red Bulls draft picks
USL League Two players
People from Piscataway, New Jersey
Sportspeople from Middlesex County, New Jersey
Association football midfielders